Santa Maria della Pace is a Roman Catholic church located on Via Emilia Levante #1300 in the town of Castelbolognese, in the region of Emilia Romagna, Italy.

History
A church at the site was first built in 1171 to celebrate peace between the town and Bologna. In 1501, the church was assigned to the Camaldolese order. A flood of the River Senio in the late 1940s destroyed that church, and it was reconstituted after 1950. In 1983, it underwent a reconstruction in a modern style that recalls the Romanesque origins. The interiors have a fresco from the 16th century, and a 15th-century tabernacle. A marble plaque near the entrance recounts the founding of the church.

References

Churches in the province of Ravenna
20th-century Roman Catholic church buildings in Italy